Wasma'a Khalid Chorbachi is an American-Iraqi artist.

Personal background 
She was born in 1944 in Cairo to Iraqi parents, living and working in the United States, is a ceramicist, calligrapher, and painter. She is considered both as a "famous Arab American female artist" and as a "specialist in Islamic art"

Selected exhibitions 
Solo exhibitions have been held in Beirut, 1966, 68, and 70; Florence, 1967; Abu Dhabi, 1976; Jedda, 1981; Cambridge, Massachusetts, 1983; London, 1984 and 85; Al-Khubar, Saudi Arabia, 1990; Sackler Museum, 2001. She participated to the group exhibition Forces of change presented in 1994 at the National Museum of Women in the Arts, Washington, where her work was described as "abstract expressionist".

Educational pursuits
Her doctoral thesis in the history of Islamic art from Harvard University, Beyond the symmetries of Islamic geometric patterns : the science of practical geometry and the process of Islamic design, made a "pioneering use of tessellation theory for the analysis of angular interlacing patterns". She directed and designed the book Issam El-Said: Artist and Scholar published in 1989 by the Issam El-Said Foundation. She taught and published on Islamic geometry. She is an instructor at the Ceramics Program of the Office for the Arts at Harvard University.

Museums
Her ceramic pieces have been acquired by notable museums around the world such as:
The British Museum;
The Royal Scottish Museum in Edinburgh;
The Boston Museum of Fine Arts, where a 2019 gallery re-install includes a video interview with the artist alongside one of her pieces;
Harvard Art Museums /Fogg Museum, Busch-Reisinger, Arther M. Sackler Museum;
Beit Al Qur'an, Bahrain, among others.

See also
 Arabesque
 Iraqi art
 Islamic art
 Islamic calligraphy
 List of Iraqi artists
 List of Iraqi women artists

References

External links
 Art by Chorbachi at Jordan National Gallery of Fine Arts
 An Islamic Pentagonal Seal coauthored by Wasma'a Khalid Chorbachi in Fivefold Symmetry,1992
 Wasma'a Khalid Chorbachi, by Raquel Wharton Rohr excerpted from vol 1. number 3 Spring 2009 of Sgraffito, the Harvard Ceramics Program newsletter

1944 births
American people of Iraqi descent
American women painters
American women ceramists
Harvard Graduate School of Arts and Sciences alumni
Iraqi calligraphers
Iraqi ceramists
Iraqi women painters
Iraqi painters
Living people
Women calligraphers
Iraqi women ceramists
21st-century American women